Nisista serrata, the serrated crest-moth, is a species of moth of the family Geometridae first described by Francis Walker in 1857. It is found in Australia, including Tasmania, Victoria and South Australia.

The wingspan is about 50 mm. Adults are brown with dark zigzag lines across the wings.

The larvae are initially black with white spots.

References

Moths described in 1857
Ennominae